The Buckwheat Boyz was an American novelty group founded by Marcus Bowens and Jermaine Fuller, with the later addition of J.J. O'Neal and Dougy Williams. The Buckwheat Boyz were signed by Koch Records, and recorded their first and only full-length record. 

The 2001 single "Peanut Butter Jelly Time", produced by Chip-Man, from this self-titled debut album became a popular internet meme after a Flash-animated music video featuring a dancing banana garnered attention online. The popularity of the song increased as it was featured on television series such as The Proud Family and Family Guy, and fellow Flash-animated series including Super Mario Bros. Z.

Legacy
Their song "Ice Cream and Cake" quickly rose in popularity after being featured in a 2009 Baskin-Robbins marketing campaign, which included a television commercial and an Ice Cream and Cake Dance Video Contest. In August 2009, Baskin-Robbins kicked off the contest by hosting the Guinness World Records Largest Cheerleading Dance event with Mario Lopez of Extra TV and 225 members of the Universal Cheerleaders Association (UCA), at the University of California Los Angeles. However, as of August 2011, the Guinness World Records archive states that the record for largest cheerleading dance was set in November 2009 by 297 participants at the University of Memphis in Memphis, Tennessee. It is not known whether this event was related to the Baskin-Robbins contest.

Old Dominion University plays "Ice Cream and Cake" at home basketball games at the Ted Constant Convocation Center, and enjoys active crowd dance participation.

The Buckwheat Boyz have also been credited for forming the basis of the popular internet meme "Peanut Butter Jelly Time".

References

Musical groups established in 1997
Musical groups disestablished in 2002
Musical groups from Miami
American hip hop DJs
Internet memes introduced in 2003